Tony Webster (January 9, 1922 - June 26, 1987) was an American screenwriter.

He wrote for Sid Caesar's Your Show of Shows, The Phil Silvers Show, Car 54, Where Are You? and The Love Boat. He died of esophagus cancer at his home in Beverly Hills, California, at the age 65.

References

External links 

American male screenwriters
Emmy Award winners
1987 deaths
1922 births
Deaths from esophageal cancer
20th-century American male writers
20th-century American screenwriters